Yi County or Yixian is a county in Hebei province of China, administratively under the jurisdiction of the prefecture-level city of Baoding.

History
This is the site where the assassin Jing Ke set off on his final journey to assassinate the King of Qin.

Administrative divisions

Towns:
Yizhou, Luangezhuang, Xiling, Peishan, Tanghu, Langyashan, Lianggang, Zijingguan

Townships:
Qiaotou Township, Baima Township, Liujing Township, Gaocun Township, Gaomo Township, Dalonghua Township, Angezhuang Township, Xishanbei Township, Weidu Township, Dule Township, Qiyu Township, Fugang Township, Pocang Township, Niugang Township, Qiaojiahe Township, Ganhejing Township, Caijiayu Township, Nanchengsi Township, Lingyunce Hui and Manchu Ethnic Township

Climate

See also
 Western Qing Tombs
 Xiadu

References

 
Geography of Baoding
County-level divisions of Hebei